is a 1995 Japan-exclusive video game for the Super Famicom. The game allows to compete in the Kyōtei races that are held all across Japan. A sequel with a few improvements was released in 1996.

Reception
On release, Famicom Tsūshin scored the game a 20 out of 40.

References

1995 video games
Motorboat racing video games
Nihon Bussan games
Japan-exclusive video games
Super Nintendo Entertainment System games
Super Nintendo Entertainment System-only games
Video games developed in Japan
Video games set in Japan
Single-player video games